Edward Bellamy (March 26, 1850 – May 22, 1898) was an American author, journalist, and political activist most famous for his utopian novel Looking Backward. Bellamy's vision of a harmonious future world inspired the formation of numerous "Nationalist Clubs" dedicated to the propagation of his political ideas.

After working as a journalist and writing several unremarkable novels, Bellamy published Looking Backward in 1888. It was one of the most commercially successful  books published in the United States in the 19th century, and it especially appealed to a generation of intellectuals alienated from the alleged dark side of the Gilded Age. In the early 1890s, Bellamy established a newspaper known as The New Nation and began to promote united action between the various Nationalist Clubs and the emerging Populist Party. He published Equality, a sequel to Looking Backward, in 1897, and died the following year.

Biography

Early life

Edward Bellamy was born in Chicopee, Massachusetts. His father was Rufus King Bellamy (1816–1886), a Baptist minister and a descendant of Joseph Bellamy. His mother, Maria Louisa Putnam Bellamy, was a Calvinist. She was the daughter of a Baptist minister named Benjamin Putnam, who was forced to withdraw from the ministry in Salem, Massachusetts, following objections to his becoming a Freemason.

Bellamy attended public school at Chicopee Falls before leaving for Union College of Schenectady, New York, where he studied for just two semesters. Upon leaving school, he made his way to Europe for a year, spending extensive time in Germany. He briefly studied law but abandoned that field without ever having practiced as a lawyer, instead entering the world of journalism. In this capacity Bellamy briefly served on the staff of the New York Post before returning to his native Massachusetts to take a position at the Springfield Union.

At the age of 25, Bellamy developed tuberculosis, the disease that would ultimately kill him. He suffered with its effects throughout his adult life. In an effort to regain his health, Bellamy spent a year in the Hawaiian Islands (1877 to 1878). Returning to the United States, he decided to abandon the daily grind of journalism in favor of literary work, which put fewer demands upon his time and his health.

Bellamy married Emma Augusta Sanderson in 1882. The couple had two children.

Literary career

Bellamy's early novels, including Six to One (1878), Dr. Heidenhoff's Process (1880), and Miss Ludington's Sister (1885), were unremarkable works, making use of standard psychological plots.

A turn to utopian science fiction with Looking Backward, 2000–1887, published in January 1888, captured the public imagination and catapulted Bellamy to literary fame. Its publisher could scarcely keep up with demand. Within a year it had sold some 200,000 copies, and by the end of the 19th century had sold more copies than any other book published in America up to that time except for Uncle Tom's Cabin by Harriet Beecher Stowe and Ben-Hur: A Tale of the Christ by Lew Wallace. The book gained an extensive readership in the United Kingdom as well, more than 235,000 copies being sold there between 1890 and 1935.

In Looking Backward, a non-violent revolution had transformed the American economy and thereby society; private property had been abolished in favor of state ownership of capital and the elimination of social classes and the ills of society that he thought inevitably followed from them. In the new world of the year 2000, there was no longer war, poverty, crime, prostitution, corruption, money, or taxes. Neither did there exist such occupations seen by Bellamy as of dubious worth to society, such as politicians, lawyers, merchants, or soldiers. Instead, Bellamy's utopian society of the future was based upon the voluntary employment of all citizens between the ages of 21 and 45, after which time all would retire. Work was simple, aided by machine production, working hours short and vacation time long. The new economic basis of society effectively remade human nature itself in Bellamy's idyllic vision, with greed, maliciousness, untruthfulness, and insanity all relegated to the past.

Bellamyite movement

Bellamy's book inspired legions of inspired readers to establish so-called Nationalist Clubs, beginning in Boston late in 1888. His vision of a country relieved of its social ills through abandonment of the principle of competition and establishment of state ownership of industry proved an appealing panacea to a generation of intellectuals alienated from the dark side of Gilded Age America. By 1891 it was reported that no fewer than 162 Nationalist Clubs were in existence.

Bellamy's use of the term "Nationalism" rather than "socialism" as a descriptor of his governmental vision was calculated, as he did not want to limit either sales of his novel or the potential influence of its political ideas. In an 1888 letter to literary critic William Dean Howells, Bellamy wrote:

Bellamy himself came to actively participate in the political movement which emerged around his book, particularly after 1891 when he founded his own magazine, The New Nation, and began to promote united action between the various Nationalist Clubs and the emerging People's Party. For the next three and a half years, Bellamy gave his all to politics, publishing his magazine, working to influence the platform of the People's Party, and publicizing the Nationalist movement in the popular press. This phase of his life came to an end in 1894, when The New Nation was forced to suspend publication owing to financial difficulties.

With the key activists of the Nationalist Clubs largely absorbed into the apparatus of the People's Party (although a Nationalist Party did run three candidates for office in Wisconsin as late as 1896), Bellamy abandoned politics for a return to literature. He set to work on a sequel to Looking Backward titled Equality, attempting to deal with the ideal society of the post-revolutionary future in greater detail. In this final work, he addressed the question of feminism, dealing with the taboo subject of female reproductive rights in a future, post-revolutionary America. Other subjects overlooked in Looking Backward, such as animal rights and wilderness preservation, were dealt with in a similar context. The book saw print in 1897 and would prove to be Bellamy's final creation.

Several short stories of Bellamy's were published in 1898, and The Duke of Stockbridge; a Romance of Shays' Rebellion was published in 1900.

Death and legacy

Edward Bellamy died of tuberculosis in Chicopee Falls, Massachusetts. He was 48 years old.

His lifelong home in Chicopee Falls, built by his father, was designated a National Historic Landmark in 1971.

Bellamy was the cousin of Francis Bellamy, famous for creation of the Pledge of Allegiance.

Bellamy Road, a residential road in Toronto, is named for the author.

Published works

Novels

Six to One (1878)
Dr. Heidenhoff's Process (1880)
Miss Ludington's Sister (1885)
Looking Backward, 2000–1887 (1888)
Equality (1897)
The Duke of Stockbridge; a Romance of Shays' Rebellion (1900)

Short stories

"At Pinney's Ranch"
"The Blindman's World"
"Deserted"
"An Echo Of Antietam"
"Hooking Watermelons"
"Lost"
"A Love Story Reversed"
"The Old Folks' Party"
"A Positive Romance"
"Potts's Painless Cure"
"A Summer Evening's Dream"
"To Whom This May Come"
"Two Days' Solitary Imprisonment"
"With The Eyes Shut"

See also
 Nationalist Clubs
 The Nationalist
 Equality Colony
 Dutch Bellamy Party
 Monument to credit card

References

Bibliography

 Six to One: A Nantucket Idyl. New York: G.P. Putnam's Sons, 1878.
 Dr. Heidenhoff's Process. London: William Reeves, 1880.
 Miss Ludington's Sister: A Romance of Immorality. Boston: James R. Osgoode and Co., 1885.
 Looking Backward, 2000–1887. Boston: Houghton, Mifflin Co., 1889.
 "How I Came to Write Looking Backward", The Nationalist (Boston), vol. 1, no. 1 (May 1889), pp. 1–4.
 Plutocracy or Nationalism – Which?
 Principles and Purposes of Nationalism: Edward Bellamy's Address at Tremont Temple, Boston, on the Nationalist Club's First Anniversary, Dec. 19, 1889. Philadelphia: Bureau of Nationalist Literature, n.d. [1890].
 The Programme of the Nationalists. Philadelphia: Bureau of Nationalist Literature, 1894. —First published in The Forum, March 1894.
 Equality. New York: D. Appleton & Co., 1898.
 The Blindman's World and Other Stories. William Dean Howells, intro. Boston: Houghton, Mifflin and Co., 1898.
 The Duke of Stockbridge: A Romance of Shays' Rebellion. New York: Silver, Burdett and Co., 1900.
 Edward Bellamy: Selected Writings on Religion and Society. Joseph Schiffman (ed.) New York: Liberal Arts Press, 1955.
 Apparitions of Things to Come: Edward Bellamy's Tales of Mystery & Imagination. Franklin Rosemont, ed. Chicago: Charles H. Kerr Publishing Company, 1990.

Further reading

 Sylvia E. Bowman, Edward Bellamy Abroad: An American Prophet's Influence. New York: Twayne Publishers, 1962.
 Sylvia E. Bowman, The Year 2000: A Critical Biography Of Edward Bellamy. New York: Bookman Associates, 1958.
 John Dewey, "A Great American Prophet", Common Sense, April 1934, pp. 1–4.
 Louis Filler, "Edward Bellamy and the Spiritual Unrest," American Journal of Economics and Sociology, vol. 8, no. 3 (April 1949), pp. 239–249. In JSTOR
 Arthur Lipow, Authoritarian Socialism in America: Edward Bellamy and the Nationalist Movement. Berkeley, CA: University of California Press, 1982
Fernando Alberto Lizarraga. “Equality, Liberty, and Fraternity: The Relevance of Edward Bellamy’s Utopia for Contemporary Political Theory.” Utopian Studies 31, no. 3 (2021): 512–31. 
 Everett W. MacNair, Edward Bellamy and the Nationalist Movement, 1889 to 1894: A Research Study of Edward Bellamy's Work as a Social Reformer. Milwaukee, WI: Fitzgerald Co., 1957.
 Arthur E. Morgan, Edward Bellamy. New York: Columbia University Press, 1944.
 Arthur E. Morgan, The Philosophy of Edward Bellamy. King's Crown Press, 1945.
 Daphne Patai (ed.), Looking Backward, 1988–1888: Essays on Edward Bellamy. Amherst, MA: University of Massachusetts Press, 1988.
 Jean Pfaelzer, The Utopian Novel in America, 1886–1896: The Politics of Form. Pittsburgh, PA: University of Pittsburgh Press, 1985.
 Robertson, Michael, 'Edward Bellamy’s Orderly Utopia', The Last Utopians: Four Late Nineteenth-Century Visionaries and Their Legacy (Princeton, NJ, 2018; online edn, Princeton Scholarship Online, 24 Jan. 2019), https://doi.org/10.23943/princeton/9780691154169.003.0003,
 Elizabeth Sadler, "One Book's Influence: Edward Bellamy's Looking Backward" New England Quarterly, vol. 17 (Dec. 1944), pp. 530–555.
 Robert L. Shurter, "The Literary Work of Edward Bellamy", American Literature, vol. 5, no. 3 (Nov. 1933), pp. 229–234.
 Ida M. Tarbell, "New Dealers of the 'Seventies: Henry George and Edward Bellamy", The Forum, vol. 92, no. 3 (Sept. 1934), p. 157.
 John Thomas, Alternative America: Henry George, Edward Bellamy, Henry Demarest Lloyd and the Adversary Tradition. Cambridge, MA: Harvard University Press, 1983.
 Richard Toby Widdicombe, Edward Bellamy: An Annotated Bibliography of Secondary Criticism. New York: Garland Publishing, 1988.
 Frances E. Willard, "An Interview with Edward Bellamy", Our Day, vol. 4, no. 24 (Dec. 1889), pp. 539–542.

External links

 
 
 Edward Bellamy Archive at marxists.org
 
 

1850 births
1898 deaths
People from Chicopee, Massachusetts
19th-century American novelists
Bellamyism
American Christian socialists
American democratic socialists
American science fiction writers
19th-century deaths from tuberculosis
Union College (New York) alumni
Tuberculosis deaths in Massachusetts
American male novelists
19th-century American male writers
Authors of utopian literature
Literature critical of work and the work ethic